The 2019–20 Irish Cup (known as the Sadler’s Peaky Blinder Irish Cup for sponsorship purposes) was the 140th edition of the premier knock-out cup competition in Northern Irish football since its inauguration in 1881. The competition began on 17 August 2019, and concluded with the final at Windsor Park on 31 July 2020. The final was the first football match in the United Kingdom to host fans since the COVID-19 pandemic in the United Kingdom led to a pause in the season in March, with 250 fans from each team permitted at the final.

Crusaders were the defending champions, having defeated NIFL Championship side Ballinamallard United 3–0 in the 2019 final to lift the cup for the fourth time overall; their first since winning the 2009 final ten years earlier.

Glentoran were the champions, taking their tally to 23 Irish Cup wins overall; their first for five years. They defeated Ballymena United 2–1 after extra time in the delayed final to qualify for the 2020–21 UEFA Europa League preliminary round.

Format and schedule
All ties level after 90 minutes used extra time to determine the winner, with a penalty shoot-out to follow if necessary.

125 clubs entered this season's competition – one fewer compared with the 2018–19 total of 126 clubs. Along with 35 of the 36 Northern Ireland Football League clubs (Lurgan Celtic withdrew from the league after the start of the season), 90 regional league clubs from tiers 4–7 in the Northern Ireland football league system also entered the competition. All 101 clubs from level 3 and below entered in the first round, with 74 of them drawn into 37 first round fixtures and the remaining 27 clubs receiving a bye. The 37 first round winners were then joined by the 27 byes in the second round. After two further rounds, the eight surviving clubs join the 24 senior NIFL Premiership and NIFL Championship clubs in the fifth round.

Results
The league tier of each club at the time of entering the competition is listed in parentheses.
(1) = NIFL Premiership
(2) = NIFL Championship
(3) = NIFL Premier Intermediate League
(NL) = Non-league (clubs outside the Northern Ireland Football League – levels 4–7)

First round
The draw for the first round took place on 5 July 2019. All clubs from level 3 and below entered in the first round, with 74 of them drawn into 37 first round fixtures and the remaining 27 clubs receiving a bye into the second round. The ties were played on 17 August 2019.

|}

|}

Second round
64 clubs entered the second round – the 37 first round winners along with the 27 byes. The matches were played on 27 and 28 September 2019. Crumlin Star and Hanover automatically advanced to the third round, after their opponents Trojans and Oxford United Stars both withdrew from the competition.

|-
|colspan="3" style="background:#E8FFD8;"|27 September 2019

|-
|colspan="3" style="background:#E8FFD8;"|28 September 2019

|}

|}

Third round
The 30 second round winners entered the third round along with the two byes. The matches were played on 2 November 2019.

|}

Fourth round
The 16 third round winners entered the fourth round. The matches were played on 30 November 2019.

|}

Fifth round
32 clubs entered the fifth round. The 24 clubs from the NIFL Premiership and NIFL Championship entered the competition at this stage, and were joined by the 8 fourth round winners. The matches were played on 4 January 2020.

|}

Sixth round
The 16 fifth round winners entered the sixth round. The matches were played on 1 February 2020.

|}

Quarter-finals
The 8 sixth round winners entered the quarter-finals, which were played on 28 and 29 February 2020.

|}

Semi-finals
The four quarter-final winners entered the semi-finals, which were originally scheduled to be played on 28 March 2020. However, as a result of the COVID-19 pandemic in Northern Ireland, the semi-finals were postponed until 27 July 2020.

|}

Final
The 2 semi-final winners entered the final. The final was originally scheduled to be played in May 2020 at Windsor Park. However, as a result of the COVID-19 pandemic in Northern Ireland, the final was postponed until 31 July 2020. One of the first football matches in the United Kingdom to be played in front of fans since the beginning of the pandemic, the match ended with Glentoran defeating Ballymena United 2–1 after extra-time to win the Cup for the 23rd time, with goals coming from Paul O'Neill and Robbie McDaid.

References

2019–20
Cup
2019–20 European domestic association football cups
Irish Cup